Peter Alexander McWilliams (August 5, 1949 – June 14, 2000) was an American self-help author who advocated for the legalization of marijuana.

Early life
McWilliams was born to a Roman Catholic family in Detroit, one of two sons of Henry G. and Mary (née Toarmina; later Fadden) McWilliams. His father worked as a supervisor at a drugstore and his mother was a part-time salesperson.

He attended Allen Park High School and Eastern Michigan University and later enrolled at Maharishi International University. At the age of 17 he wrote a collection of poems called Come Love with Me and Be My Life, which he self-published under the name Versemonger Press.

Adult life
McWilliams wrote The TM Book in 1975 with Denise Denniston, which was at the top of the New York Times bestseller list for three weeks.

In 1976, he wrote TM: An Alphabetical Guide to the Transcendental Meditation Program with Denniston and Nat Goldhaber.

He wrote TM with Harold H. Bloomfield, and later co-wrote the book How to Heal Depression.

McWilliams was active in Erhard Seminars Training with Werner Erhard and Stuart Emory's "Actualizations" large-group awareness training before meeting John-Roger in the fall of 1978. 

He wrote nearly 40 books including Surviving the Loss of a Love (1971),  The Personal Computer Book (1982) and  Life 101: Everything We Wish We Had Learned About Life in School but Didn't (1990).  His 1982 book, The Word Processing Book: A Short Course in Computer Literacy, was published during the "computer revolution" and was "highly successful." McWilliams was a photographer, and a collection of his own photographs were published in October 1992 in a book titled Portraits – A Book of Photographs by Peter McWilliams.

McWilliams was diagnosed with non-Hodgkin's lymphoma in 1996.

He was arrested and charged with growing marijuana in 1997. He was released from custody on $250,000 bail and with the "condition that he not use marijuana." His book Ain't Nobody's Business if You Do: The Absurdity of Consensual Crimes in Our Free Society, published in 1993, made a case for the legalization of drugs and became a favored publication of the Libertarian Party. Life 101 and subsequent books list John-Roger (Roger Delano Hinkins), the leader of the Church of the Movement of Spiritual Inner Awareness, as his co-writer.  McWilliams later repudiated the movement, claiming to be the sole author of the books.

Death
McWilliams died on June 14, 2000 in his Los Angeles home, of AIDS-related non-Hodgkin's lymphoma. He was survived by his mother and brother, Michael McWilliams. At the time he was awaiting sentencing for his conviction of conspiring to "possess, manufacture and sell marijuana."

Cannabis activist Richard Cowan and many critics of the drug policies in the United States have described his death as murder by the U.S. government, insofar as they denied him the use of the medical marijuana which might have prevented his death. William F. Buckley stated that McWilliams was vomiting and in pain when he died.

He is entombed at the Westwood Village Memorial Park Cemetery in Westwood, California.

Selected publications
 Surviving the Loss of a Love (Versemonger, 1971)
 The McWilliams II Word Processor Instruction Manual (1983)
 You Can't Afford the Luxury of a Negative Thought (1988), co-authored with John-Roger
  Life 101: Everything We Wish We Had Learned about Life in School but Didn't (1990)
  Do It! Let's Get Off Our Buts (1991)
 How to Survive the Loss of a Love (1991), co-authored with Melba Colgrove and Harold H. Bloomfield
 Come Love With Me and Be My Life (1992)
 Portraits – A Book of Photographs by Peter McWilliams (1992)
 Ain't Nobody's Business If You Do: The Absurdity of Consensual Crimes in a Free Society (1993)
 Life 102: What to Do When Your Guru Sues You (1994)
 Love 101: To Love Oneself is the Beginning of a Lifelong Romance (1995)

References

External links 
 Feature in People magazine
 Tribute website
 

Movement of Spiritual Inner Awareness
1949 births
2000 deaths
American cannabis activists
American libertarians
American motivational writers
American political writers
American self-help writers
Writers from Detroit
American gay writers
Eastern Michigan University alumni
AIDS-related deaths in California
LGBT people from Michigan
20th-century American non-fiction writers
20th-century American male writers
American male non-fiction writers
20th-century American LGBT people